Cevdetiye is a belde (town) in the central district (Osmaniye) of Osmaniye Province, Turkey. It is situated on the road connecting Osmaniye to Kadirli at the east end of the Çukurova (Cilicia) plains. The population of Cevdetiye is 2996  as of 2010.

References

Populated places in Osmaniye Province
Towns in Turkey
Osmaniye Central District